"The River" is a song by Canadian rock band The Tea Party. It was released as a single in Australia and the UK, where it reached #79 in the UK Singles Chart, #99 in Australia, and was a promotional single in Canada and the USA. The music video was shot in Toronto, directed by Floria Sigismondi and features a cameo by Roy Harper.

"The River" was the band's first single and is a standard three-piece rock composition with a lot of Wah-wah pedal. An acoustic version with tar (lute), santur and drums was recorded in August 1995 at Studio Morin Heights (Morin Heights) for Alhambra but appears as a B-side on the "Temptation" single and the European Triptych Special Tour Edition 2000 album.

Track listing 
"The River (radio edit)"
"The River (album)"
"Winter Solstice"
"Watching What the Rain Blows in"

Charts

References

External links
 The music video

Songs about rivers
1993 debut singles
The Tea Party songs
1993 songs
Chrysalis Records singles
Music videos directed by Floria Sigismondi